Kathy Jordan and Helena Suková were the defending champions but did not compete that year.

Lori McNeil and Betsy Nagelsen won in the final 7–6, 2–6, 7–6 against Isabelle Demongeot and Nathalie Tauziat.

Seeds
Champion seeds are indicated in bold text while text in italics indicates the round in which those seeds were eliminated.

 Lori McNeil /  Betsy Nagelsen (champions)
 Isabelle Demongeot /  Nathalie Tauziat (final)
 Jo Durie /  Sharon Walsh-Pete (semifinals)
 Sandra Cecchini /  Elna Reinach (first round)

Draw

External links
 1988 Brighton International Doubles draw

Women's Doubles
Doubles